Route 60, also known as Topsail Road in Mount Pearl and St. Johns, and as Conception Bay Highway for the rest of its length, is a  east-west highway on the Avalon Peninsula of Newfoundland. It runs between the town of Cupids and the city of St. John's.

Route description

Route 60 begins as Topsail Road at the west end of Water Street in downtown St. John's, where the road divides into Topsail Road and Waterford Bridge Road. It continues on through the west end of St. John's, then through the northern part of the city of Mount Pearl. After the overpass of Kenmount Road, the road passes through the towns of Paradise, Topsail, and Chamberlains.

After reaching the town of Manuels, Route 60 becomes the Conception Bay Highway, continuing through Conception Bay South, Holyrood, Marysvale, Brigus and ending at the intersection of Route 70 in the town of Cupids.

Within Mount Pearl and St. John's, Topsail Road is a major arterial road and commercial area.  Two shopping malls, Mount Pearl Square and the Village Shopping Centre, are located on the road, as well as a number of strip malls, fast-food restaurants, other businesses, and residential properties.

Once out of the city, Route 60 also runs along the side of Conception Bay through many small rural communities. Route 60 was the main route for many people who live outside St. Johns area to travel into the city before Route 1 (TCH) was constructed.

East of its intersection with Cornwall Avenue, Topsail Road narrows to two lanes.  The section from Cornwall Avenue to Water Street is often referred to as Old Topsail Road, although this is not its official name.

A large portion of the annual Tely 10 road race traces Route 60 eastbound through Paradise, Mount Pearl, and St. John's.

Communities along Route 60

Cupids
Cupids Crossing
Brigus
Georgetown
Marysvale
Colliers
Conception Harbour
Ballyhack
Middle Arm
Avondale
Harbour Main-Chapel's Cove-Lakeview
Holyrood
Conception Bay South
Paradise
Mount Pearl
St. John's

Major intersections

References

060
Conception Bay South
Mount Pearl
Streets in St. John's, Newfoundland and Labrador